Dan Winning (born 25 November 1997) is a Scottish rugby union player for Edinburgh in the Pro14. Winning's primary position is prop.

Rugby Union career

Professional career

Winning made his debut for Edinburgh on 21 February 2020.

References

1997 births
Living people
Edinburgh Rugby players
Rugby union props
Boroughmuir RFC players